John Desmond Anderson (born 11 September 1940) is a Northern Irish retired footballer who made over 140 appearances as an outside right in the Football League for Exeter City.

Career statistics

References

Association footballers from Northern Ireland
NIFL Premiership players
Cliftonville F.C. players
Association football central defenders
1940 births
People from Downpatrick
Living people
English Football League players
Glenavon F.C. players
Exeter City F.C. players
Northern Ireland amateur international footballers
Chesterfield F.C. players
Matlock Town F.C. players
Midland Football League players
Rangers F.C. (South Africa) players
National Football League (South Africa) players
Expatriate association footballers from Northern Ireland
Expatriate sportspeople from Northern Ireland in South Africa